The third running of the women's event of the Three Days of Bruges–De Panne, also called Lotto Women Classic  Bruges–De Panne, was held on 20 October 2020.  It was the tenth race of the rescheduled 2020 UCI Women's World Tour.

Teams
17 teams, consisting of seven of the eight UCI Women's WorldTeams and ten UCI Women's Continental Teams, competed in the race.

UCI Women's WorldTeams

 
 
 
 
 
 
 

UCI Women's Continental Teams

Results

References

External links
 

Three Days of Bruges–De Panne
Three Days of Bruges–De Panne
Three Days of Bruges–De Panne
Three Days of Bruges–De Panne (women's race)